Ammoxenus is a genus of African termite hunters first described by Eugène Simon in 1893.

Species
 it contains six species:
Ammoxenus amphalodes Dippenaar & Meyer, 1980 – South Africa
Ammoxenus coccineus Simon, 1893 – Namibia
Ammoxenus daedalus Dippenaar & Meyer, 1980 – South Africa
Ammoxenus kalaharicus Benoit, 1972 – Botswana, South Africa
Ammoxenus pentheri Simon, 1896 – Botswana, South Africa
Ammoxenus psammodromus Simon, 1910 – Southern Africa

References

Ammoxenidae
Araneomorphae genera
Spiders of Africa
Taxa named by Eugène Simon